Adam Ruckwood (born 13 September 1974) is a male English former competitive swimmer and backstroke specialist.

Swimming career
Ruckwood represented Great Britain at three consecutive Summer Olympics, starting in 1992 (Barcelona, Spain). At the ASA National British Championships he won the 100 metres backstroke title three times (1998, 2000, 2001) and the 200 metres backstroke title seven times (1993, 1994, 1995, 1997, 1998, 1999, 2000).

Ruckwood also competed in three Commonwealth Games; he represented England where he won a gold and silver medals in the backstroke events, at the 1994 Commonwealth Games in Victoria, British Columbia, Canada. Four years later he represented England again, at the 1998 Commonwealth Games in Kuala Lumpur and in 2002 he competed in his third Games.

Coaching career
He was formerly head coach at City of Birmingham Swimming Club, then moved to city of Coventry swimming club as head coach.

See also
 List of Commonwealth Games medallists in swimming (men)

References

External links 
 
 
 

1974 births
Living people
English male swimmers
Male backstroke swimmers
Olympic swimmers of Great Britain
Swimmers at the 1992 Summer Olympics
Swimmers at the 1996 Summer Olympics
Swimmers at the 2000 Summer Olympics
Sportspeople from Birmingham, West Midlands
Commonwealth Games gold medallists for England
Commonwealth Games silver medallists for England
Swimmers at the 1994 Commonwealth Games
Swimmers at the 2002 Commonwealth Games
European Aquatics Championships medalists in swimming
Commonwealth Games medallists in swimming
Medallists at the 1994 Commonwealth Games
Medallists at the 2002 Commonwealth Games